{{Automatic taxobox
| fossil_range = Early Miocene to Middle Pleistocene
| image = Hypolagus peregrinus.jpg
| image_caption = Hypolagus peregrinus skeleton
| taxon = Hypolagus
| authority = Dice, 1917
| type_species = †Hypolagus vetus| type_species_authority = Kellogg, 1910
| subdivision_ranks = Species
| subdivision = See text
}}Hypolagus is an extinct genus of lagomorph, first recorded in the Hemingfordian (early to middle Miocene) of North America. It entered Asia during the early Turolian and spread to Europe not much later, where it survived until the Middle Pleistocene. Though unknown in the Iberian Peninsula, fossils of this genus have been found in the Balearic Islands, suggesting an eastern migration during the dry period in the Mediterranean region known as the Messinian Salinity Crisis.Hypolagus generally shows features intermediate between rabbits and hares.

Species
Many species of Hypolagus have been described, including 12 from North America. Some of these species may be synonymous with others.
 
North American speciesHypolagus arizonensis Hypolagus edensis - Late PlioceneHypolagus fontinalisHypolagus furlongi - Late Pliocene - Early PleistoceneHypolagus gidleyi - Late PlioceneHypolagus oregonensisHypolagus parviplicatusHypolagus regalis - Late PlioceneHypolagus ringoldensis - Late Miocene to Early Pleistocene, Ringold Formation, WashingtonHypolagus tedfordi- Late PlioceneHypolagus vetus - Late MioceneHypolagus voorhiesi - Late Pliocene

Eurasian species
 Hypolagus  balearicus - Early Pliocene, Mallorca and possibly Ibiza
 Hypolagus brachygnathus - Late Pliocene to Middle Pleistocene, Europe
 Hypolagus gromovi - Late Turolian to Early Ruscinian, Caucasus region
 Hypolagus mazegouensis - Late Pliocene, China
 Hypolagus multiplicatus - Late Pliocene to Early Pleistocene, Baikal region
 Hypolagus peregrinus - Early Pleistocene, Sicily
 Hypolagus  petenyii (= H. beremendensis) - Early Pliocene to Early Pleistocene, Europe
 Hypolagus schreuderae - Late Pliocene to Early Pleistocene, China
 Hypolagus transbaicalicus'' - Late Pliocene to Early Pleistocene, Baikal region

References

Prehistoric lagomorphs
Prehistoric placental genera
Miocene mammals of North America
Pliocene mammals of North America
Pleistocene mammals of North America
Miocene genus first appearances
Pleistocene genus extinctions
Fossil taxa described in 1917
Miocene mammals of Europe
Miocene mammals of Asia
Pliocene mammals of Europe
Pliocene mammals of Asia
Pleistocene mammals of Europe
Pleistocene mammals of Asia
Ringold Formation Miocene Fauna